The Ealing Broadway Centre, currently branded as simply Ealing Broadway, is a shopping centre in Ealing, west London. Located on The Broadway close by Ealing Broadway station, the centre consists of 85 units both indoor and a courtyard part outdoor. It was opened on 7 March 1985 by HM the Queen and the complex includes the town square and the Ealing Central Library.

History
Ealing Broadway was designed by Keith Scott of Building Design Partnership. The  site cost £60 million to build, and was built on a site that formerly consisted of housing. The development also consisted of office space, a library, a gym, and two sculptures: The Family and The Horse.

It was complemented by a smaller shopping centre adjacent to it, built 1986 at a former 19th century department store called Sayers under the name The Waterglade Centre, and later renamed The Arcadia. The Arcadia was redeveloped in the mid-2010s and replaced by 1-8 Broadway.

The Ealing Broadway Centre was first refurbished in 2002.

The shopping centre has been owned by British Land since 2013 who purchased it from Wereldhave.

Gallery

References

Shopping centres in the London Borough of Ealing
Shopping malls established in 1985
1985 establishments in England